The John P. Bay House is located at 2024 Binney Street in the Kountze Place neighborhood of North Omaha, Nebraska. Built in 1887 by George L. Fisher, the house was designed in the Queen Anne style. It was designated an Omaha Landmark by the City of Omaha in 1981.

History
The house's first owner, John P. Bay, was a co-founder and owner of an ice company that supplied to the railroads, breweries and packing houses of the Midwest. Later the house was owned by Thomas A. Fry, one of the original organizers of Ak-Sar-Ben in 1895.

See also
Architecture in North Omaha, Nebraska
History of North Omaha
Landmarks in Omaha

References

Houses in Omaha, Nebraska
Landmarks in North Omaha, Nebraska
Omaha Landmarks
Queen Anne architecture in Nebraska

Houses completed in 1887